The 1942 San Diego State Aztecs football team represented San Diego State College during the 1942 college football season.

For this shortened season (due to World War II), San Diego State competed in the California Collegiate Athletic Association (CCAA). San Diego State did not field a team in 1943–1944. The 1942 team was led by head coach John Eubank in his first and only season with the Aztecs. They played home games at Aztec Bowl in San Diego, California. The Aztecs finished the season with zero wins, six losses and one tie (0–6–1, 0–1–0 CCAA). Overall, the team was dominated by its opponents, giving up 211 points while scoring only 50 for the season.

Schedule

Team players in the NFL
No San Diego State players were selected in the 1943 NFL Draft.

Notes

References

San Diego State
San Diego State Aztecs football seasons
San Diego State Aztecs football